The 2007 Slamdance Film Festival took place in Park City, Utah from January 18 to January 27, 2007. It was the 13th iteration of the Slamdance Film Festival, an alternative to the more mainstream Sundance Film Festival. A full list of films appearing is shown below.

Awards
The 2007 Slamdance Film Festival recognized the following films at its awards ceremony held on January 26, 2007.

Films

$99 Specials

21+ Film Series

Anarchy Online Films
All of the films in this category are available for free download on slamdance.com

Animated Shorts

Documentary Competition Features

Documentary Shorts

Gallery Shorts

Narrative Competition Features

Narrative Shorts Before Features

Special Screenings

External links
Slamdance Film Festival 2007 Homepage
Slamdance Film Festival 2007 Films
Slamdance Film Festival 2007 Schedule

Slamdance Film Festival
Slamdance Film Festival, 2007
Slamdance Film Festival, 2007
Sundance
2007 in American cinema